Orietta Calliari (born 22 March 1969) from Romeno is an Italian ski mountaineer. She lives in Busca.

Selected results 
 2003:
 2nd, Sellaronda Skimarathon (together with Silvana Iori)<ref name="sellaronda">[http://www.newspower.it/comunicati/sellaronda/AlbodoroSellaronda.rtf Sellarond ski marathon - roll of honor"]</ref>
 2004:
 1st, Sellaronda Skimarathon (together with Roberta Secco)
 2005:
 1st, Sellaronda Skimarathon (together with Roberta Secco)
2006
 1st, Italian Cup
 1st, Sellaronda Skimarathon (together with Roberta Secco)
 7th, 2006 World Championship of Ski Mountaineering team race (together with Astrid Renzler)
 2008:
 1st, Sellaronda Skimarathon (together with Annemarie Gross)
 2009:
 2nd, Trofeo Mezzalama (together with Corinne Clos and Silvia Rocca)

 External links 
 Orietta Calliari at skimountaineering.org''

References 

1969 births
Living people
Italian female ski mountaineers
Sportspeople from Trentino